Erik Nevland (born 10 November 1977) is a Norwegian former professional footballer who played as a forward. He is currently the sporting director of Viking FK. He played for clubs in Norway, England, Sweden and the Netherlands, and earned eight caps for the Norway national football team from his debut in 2001. After retiring, Nevland worked as a car salesman.

Club career
Nevland was born in Stavanger, Rogaland. He started his career at Viking FK, but in 1997 he was sold to Manchester United at the age of 19, before he had played a single first team match for the Norway side. What prompted Manchester United to sign him was a succession of hat-tricks in three games when he was on trial with them. His only goal for the United first team was in a League Cup match against Bury in October 1998. He never managed to establish himself in the United team, with a successful loan spell at Viking and an unsuccessful one at IFK Göteborg. He only ever made one league appearance for United, as a substitute against Southampton on 19 January 1998.

He returned to Viking on a permanent contract in January 2000, winning the Norwegian Cup in 2001 and scoring the two deciding goals in their famous UEFA Cup victory over Chelsea in 2002. He joined FC Groningen on a free transfer in November 2004, and since became a cult hero. In his first half-season for his new club he scored 16 times in 20 matches. Nevland scored the first ever goal in FC Groningen's new Euroborg stadium.

On 27 April 2007, Nevland signed a new three-year contract with FC Groningen. In December 2007, Nevland was voted 'Groninger of the Year' by television viewers in Groningen, although having been born outside the Netherlands.

On 28 January 2008, he signed with Premier League side Fulham for a fee of €2.5 million (£1.85 million), plus a further €0.5 million (£370k) if Fulham retained Premier League status, which they did. On 3 February, he made only his second ever Premier League appearance when Fulham played Aston Villa at Craven Cottage.

After making over 50 league appearances for Fulham, and despite Roy Hodgson's wish to keep him at the club, Nevland once again returned to Viking in June 2010. He was assigned the role as captain.

International career
He has eight international caps for the Norway national football team; his first cap was in 2001.

He also has 22 caps and one international goal to his name with the U-21 side. He participated in the 1998 UEFA European Under-21 Football Championship where Norway achieved a third-place finish.

Later career
On 5 August 2021, Nevland was appointed sporting director of Viking.

Career statistics

Honours
Fulham
UEFA Europa League runner-up: 2009–10

References

External links

Nevland's personal website 

1977 births
Living people
Sportspeople from Stavanger
Norwegian footballers
Association football forwards
Viking FK players
Manchester United F.C. players
IFK Göteborg players
FC Groningen players
Fulham F.C. players
Eliteserien players
Premier League players
Allsvenskan players
Eredivisie players
Norway youth international footballers
Norway under-21 international footballers
Norway international footballers
Norwegian expatriate footballers
Expatriate footballers in England
Expatriate footballers in the Netherlands
Expatriate footballers in Sweden
Norwegian expatriate sportspeople in England
Norwegian expatriate sportspeople in the Netherlands
Norwegian expatriate sportspeople in Sweden
Viking FK non-playing staff